Lobstick is an unincorporated community in central Alberta, Canada, within Yellowhead County.

It is on the banks of the Lobstick River, downstream from Chip Lake.

See also 
List of communities in Alberta

Localities in Yellowhead County